The Celestine Prophecy is a 2006 American film directed by Armand Mastroianni and starring Matthew Settle, Thomas Kretschmann, and Sarah Wayne Callies. The film is based on James Redfield's best-selling novel of the same name. Because the book sold over 23 million copies since its publication and has thus become one of the best-selling books of all time, Redfield had expected the film to be a success. However, the film was widely panned by critics and was a box office failure, with a total worldwide gross of $1.5 million.

Cast
 Matthew Settle as John
 Thomas Kretschmann as Wil
 Sarah Wayne Callies as Marjorie
 Annabeth Gish as Julia
 Héctor Elizondo as Cardinal Sebastian
 Joaquim de Almeida as Father Sánchez
 Jürgen Prochnow as Jensen
 John Aylward as Dobson
 Cástulo Guerra as Father José
 Obba Babatundé as Miguel
 Tequan Richmond as Basketball Player
 Vinicius Machado as Spanish Conquistador (uncredited)

Plot
Having lost his job as a middle school teacher, John Woodson (Matthew Settle) finds himself at a turning point in his life. He takes a vacation to Peru, where he spends his time exploring and searching for the ninth scroll, lost from a set of eight ancient texts, rumored to reveal the future of humanity.

Reception

Box office
The Celestine Prophecy grossed $1.2 million in North America and $286,444 in other countries for a worldwide total of $1.5 million.

Critical response
On review aggregator Rotten Tomatoes, the film has an approval rating of 4% based on 23 reviews, with an average rating of 2.4/10. The site's critical consensus reads, "Adapted from the bestselling self-help tome, The Celestine Prophesy is indifferently directed and acted, and its plotting is virtually tension-free." On Metacritic, the film has a weighted average score of 23 out of 100, based on 10 critics, indicating "generally unfavorable reviews".

Film critic Mick LaSalle of the San Francisco Chronicle called the film "clumsy -- not merely unconventional but awkward in its narrative development and dialogue", and added: "characters are sketched in shallow terms". In his top ten list of the worst films of 2006, LaSalle called it a "misbegotten film, an awkward, undramatic effort", and ranked it third on the list. Mark Olsen of the Los Angeles Times said "the movie is flatly acted and extremely ill-paced, lacking any sense of urgency, momentum or fun".

Bibliography 

 James Redfield, St Leger Joynes et Monty Joynes, The Celestine Prophecy: The Making of the Movie, Hampton Roads Publishing Company, 2005 (ISBN 978-1-57174-458-6).

See also
 Cinema of the United States
 List of American films of 2006

References

External links 
 
 
 
 

2006 films
Films about spirituality
Films based on American novels
Films directed by Armand Mastroianni
Metaphysical fiction films
2000s English-language films